Camillo Count Marcolini-Ferretti (2 April 1739 in Fano – 10 July 1814 in Prague) was a minister and general director of the fine arts for the Electorate, later Kingdom of Saxony.

The prince-elector Frederick Christian met Camillo's father in Rome and they agreed that in 1752 Camillo would be sent as donze to the Saxon court. In Saxony, Camillo gained the prince-electors and future Frederick Augustus I of Saxony's trust. In 1767 Camillo became Lord Chamberlain, 1778 Lord Controller, 1799 Lord equerry, 1772 Privy Councillor and 1809 minister of the royal cabinet. In 1813, after the Battle of Leipzig, Marcolini followed the King into exile.

Notable achievements

Camillo also became general director of the fine arts in 1780 later the director of the art academy, as well as director of the Meissen porcelain manufacture from 1774-1813. Some Meissen services from this time are known as 'Marcolini Services' after him.

Camillo founded the zoological garden and horse breeding in Annaburg in 1792.

Personal life

On 4 May 1778 Marcolini married Baroness Anna O'Kelly.
He died in 1814 in his exile in Prague

Ensigna

Camillo's ensigna from 1775 and 1814 was the crossed swords with a star.

External links
 Palais Bruehl Marcolini
 Marcolinihaus
 Adelspalais wird zum Stadtkrankenhaus

1739 births
1814 deaths
18th-century Italian people
19th-century Italian people
Italian expatriates in Germany
People from the Electorate of Saxony
People from the Kingdom of Saxony
Counts